Amant may refer to:

 Les Amants (The Lovers), a 1958 French film
 Les Amants, a 1927–1928 painting by René Magritte
 Amant, a disco music studio group formed by Ray Martínez in 1978

See also 
 Amand (584 – 679), bishop of Tongeren-Maastricht, Belgium
 Saint-Amant (disambiguation), the name of several people and towns